Golden Gate High School is located in Naples, Florida, and is one of nine public high schools located in Collier County.  It opened in 2004.

Students demographics 
Male: 53%
Female: 47%
White: 9%
Black: 18%
Hispanic: 70%
Asian: 1%
Multiracial: 2%
American Indian/Alaskan Native: <1%

Athletics
Golden Gate High School is one of the seven members of the Collier County Athletic Conference.  The school has thirteen Athletics departments. The highest placing team in school history at the state level was the 2007-2008 Lady Titan track and field team.

Winter sports

Soccer 
Wrestling
Basketball
Lacrosse

Spring sports
Baseball
Softball
Tennis
Track and Field 
Lacrosse
Football

Clubs
Mock Trial
JROTC (not a club but a class which includes after school activities)
Marching Band (not a club but a class which includes after school activities)
Chorus (not a club but a class which includes after school activities)
Orchestra (not a club but a class which includes after school activities)
Step Team 
Cheerleading
Art
Writing
Drama
Culinary
Junior Civitans
National Honor Society
Key Club
S.W.A.T.
Scholar
FCA
Anime Club
Gay/Straight Alliance

References

External links
Golden Gate High School
School profile

High schools in Collier County, Florida
Public high schools in Florida
Buildings and structures in Naples, Florida
2004 establishments in Florida
Educational institutions established in 2004